Paul Le Mesurier (23 February 1755 – 9 December 1805) was a Guernsey-born merchant, ship-owner, director of the East India Company, a Member of Parliament, an Alderman of London, and the Lord Mayor of London (1793–94).

Life and career

Le Mesurier was born the son of John Le Mesurier, the hereditary Governor of Alderney. In 1776 he went into partnership with his wife's uncle, Noah Le Cras, a London merchant. During the American War of Independence the firm had a very profitable business as prize agents. He was made an Alderman of the city in 1784 and served as Sheriff of London for 1786.

Le Mesurier was an insurance broker and underwriter at Lloyd's of London. He was a shipowner with at least one vessel that was involved in South Seas whaling.

In 1784, he was elected a director of the East India Company for the first time, and then re-elected in 1789, 1794, 1799 and 1804, each time serving for the conventional 3 years, except in the last case which was terminated by his death.

Le Mesurier was also elected in 1784 to represent Southwark in the British Parliament, retaining the seat until 1796. He was chosen in 1793 to serve as Lord Mayor of London for the following Mayoral year.

He was a Colonel in the Honourable Artillery Company from 1795 till hs death.

Le Mesurier died in 1805 at his home in Upper Homerton, Middlesex. He had married Margaret, the daughter of Isaac Roberdeau of Spitalfields, and had a son and 3 daughters.

See also
 List of East India Company directors

References

1755 births
1805 deaths
Directors of the British East India Company
Members of the Parliament of Great Britain for English constituencies
British MPs 1784–1790
British MPs 1790–1796
Sheriffs of the City of London
18th-century lord mayors of London
18th-century English politicians
British people in whaling
Honourable Artillery Company officers
Guernsey people